Sangchin (also Romanized as Sangchīn) is a village in Golian Rural District, in the Central District of Shirvan County, North Khorasan Province, Iran. At the 2006 census, its population was 195, in 42 families.

References 

Populated places in Shirvan County